King Gizzard & the Lizard Wizard are an Australian rock band formed in 2010 in Melbourne, Victoria. The band's current lineup consists of Stu Mackenzie, Ambrose Kenny-Smith, Cook Craig, Joey Walker, Lucas Harwood and Michael Cavanagh. They are known for exploring multiple genres, staging energetic live shows and building a prolific discography, having released 23 studio albums, 14 live albums, three compilations and three EPs.

Their second EP, Willoughby's Beach, and debut album, 12 Bar Bruise, primarily blended surf music and garage rock, and were released on Flightless, the band's own label. Their second album, a "psychedelic spaghetti western" titled Eyes Like the Sky, features spoken-word narration by Broderick Smith. Float Along – Fill Your Lungs, released later in the year, and the 2014 albums Oddments and I'm in Your Mind Fuzz, saw the band expand on their psychedelic sound. In 2015, they drew on elements of jazz fusion and progressive rock with Quarters!, and also released the folk-inspired Paper Mâché Dream Balloon, recorded almost entirely using acoustic instruments. Nonagon Infinity features nine interconnected tracks that form an infinite loop and won the ARIA Award for Best Hard Rock or Heavy Metal Album.

In 2017, the band fulfilled a promise to release five studio albums within the year: Flying Microtonal Banana, an experiment in microtonality, in February; the three-chapter "sci-fi heavy metal epic" Murder of the Universe in June; Sketches of Brunswick East, an improvised jazz collaboration with Mild High Club, in August; Polygondwanaland, which was released into the public domain in November; and Gumboot Soup in December. The 2019 albums Fishing for Fishies and Infest the Rats' Nest saw the band tackle environmental themes and incorporate boogie rock and thrash metal, respectively, into their sound.

In the 2020s, the band released two further microtonal studio albums – K.G. and L.W. – and the synth-based dream pop album Butterfly 3000 (all released independently), as well as several live albums, a concert film and two compilations. Eric Moore, the band's second drummer and manager, left the band in 2020 to focus on running the band's record label, Flightless. In 2022, King Gizzard released Made in Timeland, their first double album Omnium Gatherum, and released three further albums—Ice, Death, Planets, Lungs, Mushrooms and Lava, Laminated Denim and Changes—in October of the same year.

In a 2019 study conducted by the Institute of Contemporary Music Performance, King Gizzard & the Lizard Wizard was ranked No. 21 in a list of the world's hardest-working musicians. This was earned due to the number of live shows they played from January 2018 to August 2019—totalling to 113 live performances both domestically and internationally.

History

Formation, early releases and 12 Bar Bruise (2010–2012) 
The band members all grew up and went to school in the Deniliquin, Melbourne and Geelong areas of Australia. Mackenzie, Moore and Walker met studying music industry at RMIT, with the other members being mutual friends. The band started off as an informal jam band, with the eventual lineup becoming Mackenzie, Walker, Moore, Kenny-Smith, Cavanagh, Craig and Harwood. Kenny-Smith was the last to enter the band, in 2011. The band's name was created "last minute"; Mackenzie wanted to name the band "Gizzard Gizzard" while another band member wanted Jim Morrison's nickname "Lizard King". They eventually compromised with King Gizzard & the Lizard Wizard. Melbourne artist Jason Galea has created all of the band's album art and a majority of their music videos.

The band's first releases were two singles in 2010 – "Sleep" / "Summer" and "Hey There" / "Ants & Bats" – and both were self-released. The band's next release, 2011's Anglesea, was released as a four-track EP on CD. It is named after Anglesea, the coastal town where Mackenzie grew up (as well as the town where they lost a battle of the bands to punk rockers Hole in the Shoe). These early releases did not become available digitally until the inclusion of their tracks on the Teenage Gizzard compilation in 2020.

The band's second release of the year, Willoughby's Beach, was released by Shock Records on 21 October 2011. Beat Magazine described the nine-track garage rock EP as "filled to the teeth with consistently killer hooks".

The band's first full-length album, 12 Bar Bruise, was released on 7 September 2012. The 12-track garage rock album was self-recorded, and several tracks used unconventional recording methods – for example, the vocals for the album's title track were recorded through four iPhones placed around a room while Mackenzie sang into one of them.

Eyes Like the Sky, Float Along – Fill Your Lungs, Oddments and I'm in Your Mind Fuzz (2013–2014) 
King Gizzard & the Lizard Wizard's second full-length album, Eyes Like the Sky, was released on 22 February 2013. Described as a "cult western audio book", the album is narrated by Broderick Smith and tells a story of outlaws, child soldiers, Native Americans and gun fights—all set in the American frontier. The album was written collaboratively by Smith and Stu Mackenzie. When asked about the album's influences, Mackenzie said: "I love Western films. I love bad guys and I love Red Dead Redemption. Oh, and I love evil guitars". Mackenzie also stated in a 2020 Reddit AMA that Eyes Like the Sky was written as a response to being typecast in their previous releases—a reaction that "irks" him to this day.

The band's third full-length album, Float Along – Fill Your Lungs, was released on 27 September 2013. King Gizzard shifted from garage rock to a more mellow folk and psychedelic sound on the eight-track album. It also saw Eric Moore start playing drums, after previously playing theremin and keyboards.

Float Along – Fill Your Lungs was followed by Oddments, released on 7 March 2014. Over the course of the 12-track album, the band takes a more melodic approach, and Mackenzie's vocals are more prominent. Oddments has been described as being "recorded through a woolen sock in an adjacent room".

The band's fifth full-length album, I'm in Your Mind Fuzz, was released on 31 October 2014. The 10-track album touches on elements of fantasy and lyrically delves into the concept of mind control. This was the first time the band took a "traditional" approach to writing and recording an album: the songs were written, the band rehearsed together and they recorded the songs "as a band" in the studio. Pitchfork described the album as "open[ing] with a sprint" and ending "with some of their best slow jams". In 2019, I'm in Your Mind Fuzz came at No. 6 on Happy Mag list of "The 25 best psychedelic rock albums of the 2010s".

Quarters!, Paper Mâché Dream Balloon, Nonagon Infinity and Gizzfest (2015–2016) 

Quarters!, King Gizzard's sixth full-length album, was released on 1 May 2015. The album features four songs, each running for 10 minutes and 10 seconds, making each song a quarter of the album. Drawing upon jazz fusion and acid rock, the album's more laid-back sound was described as "unlike anything they've released before" and as "an album more likely to get your head bobbing and hips shaking as opposed to losing footwear in a violent mosh".

On 17 August 2015, King Gizzard released the title track "Paper Mâché Dream Balloon" as the lead single for the album with the same name. The band then published the official audio for the second single, "Trapdoor," and released its music video on 10 November. Three days after, on 13 November, did the band release its seventh full-length album, Paper Mâché Dream Balloon. This "concept-less concept album" features only acoustic instruments and was recorded on Mackenzie's parents' farm in rural Victoria. The album features "a collection of short unrelated songs" described as "mellow, defuzzed psychedelia". It was the band's first album to be released in the United States via ATO Records.

2015 saw the band launch Gizzfest in Melbourne, a two-day music festival that was held annually and toured Australia, featuring both local and international acts.

The band's eighth full-length album, Nonagon Infinity, was released worldwide on 29 April 2016. Described by Mackenzie as a "never-ending album", it features nine songs connected by musical motifs which flow "seamlessly" into each other with the last track "linking straight back into the top of the opener like a sonic mobius strip". On 8 March, the band released a video for the first single, "Gamma Knife". It contained a riff from the song "People Vultures", which premiered on 4 April, followed by a music video released on 6 May. The album received high praise from critics, with Pitchforks Stuart Berman writing that it "yields some of the most outrageous, exhilarating rock 'n' roll in recent memory". The album also received glowing reviews from numerous other publishers: Happy Mag Maddy Brown described it as "an intensely striking, ferocious sound that gets the blood flowing and heart racing", while NME Larry Bartleet wrote that "If you wanted to, you could listen to it forever in one unbroken melody". The band earned its first ARIA Award when Nonagon Infinity won the 2016 ARIA Award for Best Hard Rock or Heavy Metal Album.

 Five albums in one year (2017) 

The band's ninth full-length album, Flying Microtonal Banana (Explorations Into Microtonal Tuning, Volume 1), was recorded in the band's own studio and released on 24 February 2017. Originally conceived as a record to be played on the Turkish bağlama, a stringed instrument with movable frets, the album was recorded using custom microtonal instruments on a 24 TET scale. Flying Microtonal Banana has been described as "a soaring take on microtonal music". Three tracks were issued in advance: "Rattlesnake", the opening track, in October 2016; "Nuclear Fusion" in December 2016; and "Sleep Drifter" in January 2017. The band released a music video for "Rattlesnake", directed by Jason Galea, a video which Happy Mags Luke Saunders described as "a masterclass in hypnotism".

Another full-length album, Murder of the Universe, was released on 23 June 2017. Described by the band as a "concept album to end all concepts", it is divided into three chapters: The Tale of the Altered Beast and The Lord of Lightning vs. Balrog – both released on 30 May 2017 – and Han-Tyumi and the Murder of the Universe, which was released on 11 April 2017. The Spill Magazine explained that the album "describes the impeding doom of the world in a dark fantasy genre kind of way". It is narrated by Leah Senior for the first two chapters and a text-to-speech program for the final chapter. The band made their international television debut on 17 April 2017, performing "The Lord of Lightning" on Conan on TBS in the United States.

King Gizzard's next full-length album, Sketches of Brunswick East, a collaboration with Alex Brettin's psychedelic jazz project, Mild High Club, was released on 18 August 2017. Taking inspiration from Miles Davis' 1960 album Sketches of Spain, as well as the band's base recording location of Brunswick East in Melbourne, it is a jazz-improvisational album. Mackenzie described the record as "perhaps representing greater changes that are happening in the wider world, and (this is) our attempt to find beauty within a place that we spend so much time", referring to the constant changes in their neighbourhood.

King Gizzard's 12th studio album, Polygondwanaland, was released as a free download on 17 November 2017. The band encouraged fans and independent record labels to create their own pressings of the album, stating that "Polygondwanaland is FREE. Free as in, free. Free to download and if you wish, free to make copies. Make tapes, make CD's, make records . . . Ever wanted to start your own record label? GO for it! Employ your mates, press wax, pack boxes. We do not own this record. You do. Go forth, share, enjoy". The album was promoted with the release of the first track, "Crumbling Castle", on 18 October 2017. A music video created by Jason Galea accompanied its release on YouTube. As of March 2022, 325 different versions of the album have been recorded on the physical music database Discogs, and it has been called "the ultimate vinyl release".

Mackenzie confirmed in early December that the fifth and final album of 2017 would be coming "very, very late in the year". Two singles were digitally released less than a week later: "All Is Known", which had previously been performed live, and "Beginner's Luck", an entirely new song. These singles were followed by two more: "The Last Oasis" and "Greenhouse Heat Death", both released on the 20th. On 30 December, the band posted on Facebook that Gumboot Soup would be released the following day. Mackenzie explained in an interview that the songs on the album are "definitely not B-sides or anything. They're more songs that didn't work in any of the rest of the four records, or they didn't fit into any of those categories that well, or they came together slightly after when those records came together".

In December, Consequence of Sound named King Gizzard & the Lizard Wizard Band of the Year, praising both the quantity and quality of their 2017 releases.

Fishing for Fishies, Infest the Rats' Nest and reissues (2018–2019) 
Throughout 2018, King Gizzard continued to perform live shows, but did not release any new material. Instead, they re-released five older records – the Willoughby's Beach EP, 12 Bar Bruise, Eyes Like the Sky, Float Along – Fill Your Lungs and Oddments – on CD and vinyl. They also released an official pressing of 2017's Polygondwanaland.

On 21 January 2019, the band announced on their Instagram page that new music was in the works, with an image in a studio of Gareth Liddiard (The Drones, Tropical Fuck Storm) flipping the bird as members of King Gizzard play in the background, which led to some speculation about Liddiard's possible involvement in the band's new material. On 1 February, the band put out a music video for their new single "Cyboogie" and released the song as a 7-inch single backed with "Acarine". A week later, they announced another North American tour and a show at Alexandra Palace in London, which they promised would feature "a new set, new songs and a whole new visual experience", and described as being their biggest ever.

In March, the band announced their 14th album, Fishing for Fishies, with a release date of 26 April 2019. A day later, the band officially released and uploaded a music video for the title track to YouTube. Later that month, the band released another single from the album, "Boogieman Sam", and on 24 April – two days before the album release – the band released a final single, "The Bird Song". Two days later, Fishing for Fishies was released.

The 2019 Gizzfest never occurred. With the Gizzfest taking place in 2018, the band announced on their official Instagram page that the festival would be cancelled. Some fans think this was due to their heavy touring schedule. Walker jokingly said on their Instagram, "Gizzfest is never happening again because it was always a piece of sh*t. I was embarrassed to be apart of [sic] it."

On 9 April, the band released a music video for a new song, "Planet B". During a Reddit AMA on 30 April, Mackenzie confirmed that the next King Gizzard album was being made and would include "Planet B", but the band had not decided whether or not it would be released in 2019. The album was confirmed to be titled Infest the Rats' Nest. Mackenzie also said that their Gizzfest festival would be held outside of Australia for the first time in 2019.

Infest the Rats' Nest, released on 16 August, was entirely in a thrash metal style. At the ARIA Music Awards of 2019, Infest the Rats' Nest was nominated for ARIA Award for Best Hard Rock or Heavy Metal Album.

Chunky Shrapnel, K.G., L.W. and the departure of Eric Moore (2020–2021)
In January 2020, the band released three live albums as downloads on Bandcamp, pledging to donate  of the proceeds towards relief for the 2019–20 Australian bushfire season: Live in Adelaide '19, recorded at Thebarton Theatre on 12 July 2019, and Live in Paris '19, recorded at L'Olympia on 14 October 2019, were released 10 January, while Live in Brussels '19, recorded at the Ancienne Belgique on 8–9 October 2019, was released 15 January. The albums' sales benefit Animals Australia, Wildlife Victoria and Wires Wildlife Rescue, respectively.

In the wake of the COVID-19 pandemic, the band postponed their Greek Theatre and Red Rocks three-hour marathon shows for later in the year. The band had also produced a film to be released, titled Chunky Shrapnel from a lyric of the song "Murder of the Universe" from the album of the same name; however, also due to the outbreak, the initial viewing was postponed for a later date and then cancelled. The film was directed by John Angus Stewart, and was recorded during the band's 2019 tour in Europe.

In April, the band stated that during lockdown, they had worked on new material for upcoming albums. Mackenzie reported that one will be "pretty chill", another "kind of jazzy", and "some of it is microtonal", and the band was also experimenting with electronic music and "messing around with some more polymetric stuff". In the same interview, when asked about more live recordings, Mackenzie also said that the band had recorded almost every show they played in 2019, and may release them in a similar fashion to Pearl Jam's official live bootlegs. June saw the release of RATTY, a short documentary about the making of Infest the Rat's Nest. The film was made available to rent online with all proceeds going to Australians for Native Title and Reconciliation (ANTAR), BlaQ Aboriginal Corporation, Djirra and Indigenous Social Justice Association Melbourne. After $20,000 had been raised, the film was then made free to watch on YouTube. Later that month, in celebration of Love Record Store Day, the band released a limited print of eco-friendly versions of 10 releases dating back to between 2014 and 2017.

Due to the COVID-19 pandemic, the band postponed the marathon shows and North American tour for a second time, with the new dates being for October 2021. A statement he received from the band confirmed the new tour dates and additional confirmation that the band will release some new albums before said tour.
On 25 August, Eric Moore announced via Instagram his departure from the band as both an active member and the band's manager without citing any direct reason, stating he was "deeply saddened by the decision" and "[doesn't] have any regrets". The band further elaborated, also via Instagram, that he was stepping away from the band "to focus solely on Flightless Records."

On 2 October, the band released two albums via Bandcamp. The first, Demos Vol. 1 + Vol. 2, includes 28 demos of songs spanning the band's entire career. This included older songs like "Footy Footy" from 12 Bar Bruise, along with songs like "Straws in the Wind", which had only been released less than a month prior. The second was a live album of the same variety as the three released in January, Live in Asheville '19, which was recorded live at New Belgium Brewing Company in Asheville, North Carolina, on 1 September 2019.

On 20 October 2020, the band teased the release of their 16th studio album, K.G. (Explorations into Microtonal Tuning, Volume 2), and another live album, Live in San Francisco '16, with both albums being released on 20 November. Alongside this, the band released the fourth single from K.G., "Automation", which was released for free on their website in a similar manner to their 2017 album Polygondwanaland. In addition to the raw audio files for the song as a whole, the band also included the files for separate audio channels within the song such as vocals, violin, clarinet and flute. They also released the video files for the song's music video, of which the band stated, "If you'd like to create your own music video for 'Automation', we have supplied you with the raw video files to do so". All of these files require a torrent client to be installed on the user's device.

In an interview with NME, Joey Walker said that 2021 would be a big year of output with some of their most divisive music yet, claiming: "Part of me thinks this is the best we've ever done. And part of me thinks it's the worst." He also talked about making a sequel to Chunky Shrapnel.

In 2020, King Gizzard & the Lizard Wizard were listed at No. 47 in Rolling Stone Australias "50 Greatest Australian Artists of All Time" issue.

Their 17th studio album, L.W., was released on 26 February 2021. The album is a direct sequel to the previous album K.G. and the third volume in the "Explorations into Microtonal Tuning" series. On 19 March 2021, the band released Live in Melbourne '21, recorded from one of their first shows since the pandemic. This album became part of the band's bootleg program, with accompanying video footage.

 The band's 18th full-length album, Butterfly 3000, was announced on 11 May. The band stated that the album would be due 11 June and would have no singles leading to release. It was also revealed that the album had 10 tracks and was built around modular synthesizer loops. The album art was to feature a "cross-eyed" autostereogram by long-time collaborator Jason Galea.

On 29 May, Live in Sydney '21 was released through the band's bootleg program, the seventh live recording in the program and ninth album overall. A video recording of the performance was also released. The band announced that they would be performing a series of five concerts at Sydney's Carriageworks. Each concert would have a different, pre-planned setlist, themed around a different style of music, including acoustic, "jams", microtonal, garage rock and heavy metal.

Butterfly 3000, Omnium Gatherum and beyond (2021–present)
Butterfly 3000 was released on all streaming platforms on 11 June 2021. The album received generally positive reviews, with reviewers commending the album on its "sonic adventurism" and describing the songs as "pop-oriented additions [that] are a perfect pairing to their existing sound", while some critics said that the album's "formulaic approach lacks surprise". A music video featuring DJ Shadow debuted on YouTube on 6 January. Remix album Butterfly 3001 was released on 21 January, featuring 21 remixes of Butterfly 3000 songs.

In February, the band announced a three-hour marathon set in Melbourne, naming the one-off show Return of the Curse of Timeland, set to take place on 5 March. Made in Timeland could be bought at the show, and was made available on the band's website the same day.

On 8 March, the band announced their 20th studio album, Omnium Gatherum, which was released on 22 April. They also released the 18-minute track "The Dripping Tap", their longest to date, as a single. Six days later on 14 March, the band released a joint EP alongside Tropical Fuck Storm titled Satanic Slumber Party. The EP originated during the recording sessions for Fishing for Fishies, during which the two groups collaborated on a jam section titled "Hat Jam". Sections of both "The Dripping Tap" and "Satanic Slumber Party" were adapted from these sessions, with a special limited-edition 12" vinyl, Hat Jam, released containing both releases.

On 16 June, the band won the inaugural Environmental Music Prize with their 2020 single "If Not Now, Then When?" They were awarded $20,000 in prize money, the entirety of which was donated to The Wilderness Society.

On 18 June, the band posted a tweet promising three more albums by the end of 2022. More details came on 12 July, when it was reported that the first two of these were "built from all six members jamming for hours", similarly to the recording process of "The Dripping Tap" from Omnium Gatherum. The later album was teased as being "something Gizzard has been working on since 2017 – the longest amount of time the band has ever spent on a single record". Mackenzie stated that "There isn't a jamming vibe on it. It's super considered, for a Gizz record. Every overdub and every part is important", and described the record as "more of a song cycle".

On 15 July, the band released two additional volumes of demos on their Bootlegger program, titled Music to Eat Pond Scum To and Music To Die To. In an article announcing this release, the band shared a bit more about their next two albums, stating that they were "built from hours-long jams and then pieced together after the fact". 

On 5 August, the band cancelled the remaining 13 dates of their summer European tour so frontman Stu Mackenzie could return to Australia for treatment in his battle with Crohn's disease.

On 1 September, the band announced that they will release three studio albums in October 2022. A music video for one of their new songs, "Ice V", premiered on 7 September. Later the same day, the band revealed the titles, cover artwork and release dates for the three albums: Ice, Death, Planets, Lungs, Mushrooms and Lava was released on 7 October, with Laminated Denim following on 12 October and Changes on 28 October.

On 24 January 2023, the band released “Live At Red Rocks ‘22”, an official bootleg live album compiling the three nights they performed at the Red Rocks Amphitheatre in Colorado on 10–11 October and 2 November, totaling 86 tracks spanning eight and half hours of material.

On 4 March, the band debuted a new song “Gila Monster” during a live performance in the Netherlands. It was described as a metal track and had Stu, Joey & Ambrose on vocals. On March 12th, 2023, the band released a short video on their social media account's titled "New Album locked and JOEDED" that features a small clip of a new song that is presumably on a new upcoming album.

Musical styles and the "Gizzverse"

The band has explored a wide range of genres, primarily melding psychedelic rock, garage rock, acid rock, progressive rock, surf rock, krautrock, psychedelic pop, indie rock and neo-psychedelia. Several later releases have been in heavy metal styles, in particular thrash metal and stoner metal on Infest the Rats' Nest, and also sludge and groove metal. Folk, jazz and Tropicália have also occasionally been integrated into their sound. The band wrote Butterfly 3000 as a "synth-prog" album entirely in major keys, and on Omnium Gatherum, the band also explored rap for the first time. In describing their style, Chris DeVille of Stereogum wrote, "It's a rare group that can convincingly blur the lines between Phish, Neu!, King Crimson, and the Osees while never sounding like anything less than themselves."

Unusual in Western rock music, starting in 2017 with album Flying Microtonal Banana, the band have experimented with microtonal music using custom built guitars in 24 TET tuning, as well as several other modified instruments. This was inspired by Middle Eastern and Turkish music, including Anatolian rock, and their customised guitars were modelled off the bağlama. Mackenzie described it as "kind of a Dorian mode with a half flat sixth and a half flat second, because that was the way my baglama was fretted". After Flying Microtonal Banana, the band went on to create two more albums utilising this scale – K.G. and L.W. – while also utilising it in other one-off songs. Many of the band's songs feature unusual time signatures, such as 7/8 and 5/4, and frequent time signature changes. Their albums Polygondwanaland and Butterfly 3000 feature polyrhythms in several songs.

Many of the band's releases are based on a unique concept, yet share lyrical themes and feature characters that form a recurring cast, the most frequent being Han-Tyumi, a cyborg character who appears across multiple albums. Their songs also tell stories of people-vultures, bushrangers and Balrogs, as well as "lightning gods, flesh-eating beasts, sages and space-faring eco rebels". Members of r/KGATLW, a subreddit dedicated to the band, popularised the term "Gizzverse" to describe the overarching narrative of their discography, about which many theories have been propagated. In a 2017 interview, Stu Mackenzie confirmed that the band's releases are all connected, saying, "They all exist in this parallel universe and they may be from different times and different places but they all can co-exist in a meaningful way". In the same interview, drummer Eric Moore joked that even prior to the band's formation, they decided how the story will end.

The band's lyrics have featured environmental themes, and topics have included pollution, environmental degradation and climate change, particularly on the albums Infest the Rats' Nest, Flying Microtonal Banana, Fishing for Fishies, K.G. and L.W.. Mackenzie has said: "We've got a lot of things to fear... I spend a lot of time thinking about the future of humanity and the future of Planet Earth. Naturally these thoughts seep into the lyrics". The band's lyrical themes also address political and social issues, with Walker saying: "We try not to be too didactic in how we go about it, though there probably are times where it [could] be. We try to bury it in metaphor and other shit". "Minimum Brain Size" on K.G. was inspired by the Christchurch mosque shootings.

Band membersCurrent members Stu Mackenzie – vocals, guitars, keyboards, flute, bass guitar, percussion, sitar, piano, organ, violin, clarinet, saxophone, zurna, drums
 Ambrose Kenny-Smith – vocals, harmonicas, keyboards, percussion, piano, saxophone, guitar, organ 
 Joey Walker – guitars, vocals, bass guitar, keyboards, piano, setar, percussion 
 Cook Craig – guitars, bass guitar, piano, keyboards, percussion, vocals 
 Lucas Harwood – bass guitar, piano, keyboards, percussion, vocals 
 Michael Cavanagh – drums, percussion, vocalsFormer members Eric Moore – drums, management, vocals, theremin, keyboards, percussion  Contributors and collaborators'''
 John Angus Stewart – visuals
 Jason Galea – visuals, artwork, layouts
 Sam Joseph – live show sound engineering
 Jamie Wdziekonski – photographer, visuals
 Broderick Smith – narration, writing and co-creator of Eyes Like the Sky and guest narration on "Sam Cherry's Last Shot" for 12 Bar Bruise.
 Leah Senior – narration for chapters 1 and 2 of Murder of the Universe and guest narration on "The Castle in the Air" for Polygondwanaland.
 Alexander Brettin – member of Mild High Club, co-creator of Sketches of Brunswick East and remixed "Butterfly 3000" for Butterfly 3001.
 Tropical Fuck Storm – co-recorded the "Hat Jam" and Satanic Slumber Party, and released the latter alongside "The Dripping Tap" in the Hat Jam vinyl release.

Discography

 Willoughby's Beach (EP, 2011)
 12 Bar Bruise (2012)
 Eyes Like the Sky (with Broderick Smith, 2013)
 Float Along – Fill Your Lungs (2013)
 Oddments (2014)
 I'm in Your Mind Fuzz (2014)
 Quarters! (2015)
 Paper Mâché Dream Balloon (2015)
 Nonagon Infinity (2016)
 Flying Microtonal Banana (2017)
 Murder of the Universe (with Leah Senior, 2017)
 Sketches of Brunswick East (with Mild High Club, 2017)
 Polygondwanaland (2017)
 Gumboot Soup (2017)
 Fishing for Fishies (2019)
 Infest the Rats' Nest (2019)
 K.G. (2020)
 L.W. (2021)
 Butterfly 3000 (2021)
 Made in Timeland (2022)
 Omnium Gatherum (2022)
 Ice, Death, Planets, Lungs, Mushrooms and Lava (2022)
 Laminated Denim (2022)
 Changes'' (2022)

Awards and nominations

References

External links

 Discography at Discogs
 Band homepage

Musical groups from Melbourne
Australian psychedelic rock music groups
Australian progressive rock groups
Australian rock music groups
Musical groups established in 2010
2010 establishments in Australia
Heavenly Recordings artists
ARIA Award winners
ATO Records artists
Australian heavy metal musical groups
Microtonal musicians
Australian garage rock groups
Neo-psychedelia groups
Acid rock music groups
Psychedelic pop music groups
Environmental musical artists
Australian thrash metal musical groups
Australian surf rock groups
Dream pop musical groups
Space rock musical groups
 Ableton Live users